Phallusia mammillata is a solitary marine tunicate of the ascidian class found in the eastern Atlantic Ocean and the Mediterranean Sea.

Description
The tunic is a translucent, bluish-white colour and is covered with irregular rounded lobes or mounds.

Distribution

Biology
Like all tunicates, Phallusia mammillata has a thick leathery tunic containing a cellulosic material. The tunic encloses a sac-shaped cavity with separate siphons through which water is drawn in and expelled. The animal feeds on the planktonic particles that it filters from the incoming seawater by passing it through a mucous net.

P. mammillata is one of a small number of ascidians that accumulate the element vanadium in their blood cells. It is unclear why the tunicate should do this, but concentrations of up to 350 mM have been found, some ten million times higher than in the surrounding seawater. The ascidian has at least ten different types of blood cell, and the vanadium-accumulating cells have been shown to be "vacuolated and granular amoebocytes, signet ring cells and type-II compartment cells".

Each P. mammillata individual is a hermaphrodite. Eggs are released through the exhalent siphon and external fertilization in the water column takes place. The eggs hatch into free-swimming, tadpole-like larvae, which within a few days settle on the seabed and undergo metamorphosis into juveniles.

References

External links

 

Enterogona
Animals described in 1815